Andy Kim may refer to:

Andy Kim (singer) (born 1946), Canadian singer
Andy Kim (Capitol album), his 1974 album
Andy Kim (politician) (born 1982), American politician and member of Congress from New Jersey

Other 
 Andrew Kim (disambiguation)